Alibaba Aur 40 Chor may refer to:
 Alibaba Aur 40 Chor (1954 film)
 Alibaba Aur 40 Chor (1966 film)
 Alibaba Aur 40 Chor (1980 film)

See also
 Ali Baba and the Forty Thieves